Samuel Emlen Walker (born December 19, 1942) is an American civil liberties, policing, and criminal justice expert. He specializes in police accountability.

Early life and education
Walker was born in Indianapolis, Indiana, but grew up in Shaker Heights, Ohio. His father was an executive who worked for the railroad.

In December 1964, Walker received a B.A. in American Culture from the University of Michigan, where he wrote film reviews for The Michigan Daily student newspaper for a semester. In 1970, Walker received an M.A. in American history from University of Nebraska Omaha. In 1973, he earned a PhD in American history from Ohio State University. His thesis was on Terence V. Powderly, and was called "Terence V. Powderly, "Labour Mayor": Workingmen's Politics in Scranton, Pennsylvania 1870-1884". His thesis advisor was K. Austin Kerr.

Career

Mississippi Freedom Summer
In the spring of 1964, civil rights activist Robert "Bob" Moses visited the University of Michigan-Ann Arbor in a drive to recruit students like Walker to go to Mississippi as part of the Council of Federated Organizations (COFO)'s Mississippi Freedom Summer. After orientation/training in Ohio and raising US$500 for bail, for six weeks in the summer of 1964 starting in June 1964, Walker worked as a volunteer, going on door-to-door voter registration drives to encourage African American citizens to register to vote. Part of the effort was to highlight the restrictions on voter registration and to establish a non-violent right to organize and empower in the face of institutional terrorism of the Black community in Mississippi.

After graduating from college, Walker returned to Mississippi in January 1965 to continue the Mississippi Freedom Project. Walker was based in Gulfport, Mississippi until August 1966.

Teaching
From 1969 to 1970, Walker was a teaching assistant at the University of Nebraska Omaha (UNO) while earning his master's degree. From 1970 to 1973, he was a teaching associate at Ohio State University while working on his PhD. In August 1974, Walker was hired as an assistant professor of criminal justice at UNO, eventually becoming a professor of criminal justice in 1984. From 1993 to 1999, he was Kiewit Professor, and then from 1999 to 2005, he was Isaacson Professor. Walker retired as a professor emeritus in 2005. He continues to work as a consultant.

Walker has said that he started out with a focus on police-community relations. That expanded into the area of citizen oversight of the police, and eventually became a specialization of concentrating on police accountability.

Civil liberties expert
In 2000, Walker was hired to work on a grant funded report for the U.S. Department of Justice called Early Intervention Systems for Law Enforcement Agencies: A Planning and Management Guide, published in 2004.

In 2013, Walker testified in New York City as an expert against the NYPD's policy of stop and frisk.

From 2015 to 2016, Walker worked as a consultant to the Royal Canadian Mounted Police in Ottawa, Ontario on a project for the development of an Early Intervention System (EIS) for its police force.

Walker has created the Police Accountability Resource Guide, an online guide with links and resources for educators and organizers.

Membership
 1964: Ann Arbor Friends of SNCC, spokesman
 2001-2004: National Academy of Sciences, Panel Member for "Fairness and Effectiveness in Policing: The Evidence"
 2015-present: American Law Institute (ALI), Advisory Committee Member on Principles of Law: Police Investigations
 2015-2016: National Academy of Sciences, Consultant on "Project of Proactive Policing"

Awards
 2012: Langum Prize, David J. Langum, Sr. Prize in American Legal History or Biography for Presidents and Civil Liberties From Wilson to Obama
 2018: Academic Freedom Coalition of Nebraska (AFCON), Academic Freedom Award
 2018: American Society of Criminology (ASC) Division of Policing, Lifetime Achievement Award

Selected works and publications

Selected works
 
 
  – part of Garland Reference Library of Social Science, Organizations and Interest Groups v. 743, 3

Selected publications

References

External links
 
 Today in Civil Liberties History, a daily calendar of civil liberties events
 These Rights Are Our Rights, an anthem for the Bill of Rights
 Samuel Walker Papers, 1964-1966 at the Wisconsin Historical Society

Living people
People from Indianapolis
People from Shaker Heights, Ohio
People from Omaha, Nebraska
University of Michigan alumni
University of Nebraska Omaha alumni
University of Nebraska Omaha faculty
Ohio State University Graduate School alumni
1942 births
Activists for African-American civil rights
Activists from Nebraska
American non-fiction writers